Breath from Another  is the debut studio album by Canadian singer-songwriter Esthero. The album was released on April 28, 1998 and now generally considered a trip hop classic despite poor sales. Despite its containing several expletives and sexual content, the album was not released with a Parental Advisory warning. Thanks in part to the success of the album's music videos, the album has sold over 100,000 copies in the United States, and achieved Gold certification in the artist's native Canada.

Background
Esthero and Doc McKinney met in January 1996 at the EMI in Toronto. The pair's demos sparked interest from Warner Music Group, EMI and BMG in Canada. Esthero's managers, Zack Werner and Beau Randall, signed them directly to Sony Music Entertainment in U.S. The duo suddenly wrote "Superheroes", "Indigo Boy" and "That Girl." In August 1996 they wrote another 4 tracks, include the single "Heaven Sent".In late January, 1998, prior to album's release 15,000 copies of promo EP "Short of Breath", featuring tracks "Breath from Another", "Heaven Sent", "Country Livin' (The World I Know)" and "That Girl" were sent to Sony Music staff worldwide. McKinney stated in a 2016 NPR interview that, when writing and producing the album, he was inspired by reggae, calypso, and house music, three genres that didn't receive much exposure in his native Minneapolis, also citing Björk, Portishead, and Massive Attack as influences.

Critical reception

Breath from Another received positive reviews from music critics. Tom Demalon of Allmusic stated that album "too scrumptious sounding to be ignored", however called it unfocused. He praised tracks "That Girl" and "Country Livin' (The World I Know)" as album's best offerings. Chris Molanphy of CMJ New Music Monthly noted that album sounds "slick for starters; clamorous but never abrasive, yearning but not very dark" and "organic". The A.V. Club'''s review, penned by David Peisner, was also positive, commenting that while some of the songs were unimaginative, some (such as "Heaven Sent" and "Country Livin'") were more unusual, and praising Esthero's vocals as "sublime" and "sultry".

Accolades
At the Juno Awards of 1999, the album received a nomination for "Best Alternative Album." However, it lost to Rufus Wainwright's eponymous debut album. In 2016, the album was nominated for a Polaris Heritage Prize, for best album from 1996-2005. The album lost, however, to Arcade Fire's "Funeral" (which won the public vote) and Lhasa de Sela's "La Llorona" (which won the jury vote).

Commercial performance
Despite not charting in any country, the album sold 118,000 copies in the US and over 250,000 copies worldwide as of 2005. In Esthero's native country Canada, the album sold over 50,000 copies and received Gold certification. "Heaven Sent" and "That Girl" received significant play on Canadian television (namely the music channel MuchMusic), and also received some airplay on MTV. "Heaven Sent" reached number 27 on MTV's most-played videos chart.

Singles
"Heaven Sent"  was released as the album's first official single. It was released as a double A-side CD single with "Breath from Another". A music video was shot and received MTV airplay. The single charted at #4 on Billboard Hot Dance Breakout Maxi-Singles Sales. "That Girl" was slated to be the album's second official single, but was never officially released commercially. It was released as the album's second promotional single instead. A music video was shot and aired on MuchMusic.

Uses in media
The title track was featured on the CMJ New Music Monthly February 1998 promotional CD. "Lounge" appears on the soundtrack to film Zero Effect. The remix of "Country Livin' (The World I Know)" featuring dirty south hip hop quartet Goodie Mob was included on the Slam soundtrack. Tracks "Anywayz" and "That Girl" was used in films Boiler Room and I Still Know What You Did Last Summer'' respectively.

Track listing

Personnel
Adapted in part from album booklet and Allmusic
 Esthero - producer, string arrangements, vocals
 Martin "Doc" McKinney - engineer, horn arrangements, producer, programming, string arrangements
 A'ba-Cus - drum programming, engineer, programming
 Evan Cranley - trombone
 Zoren Gold - design, photography
 Dave Gouveia - percussion
 Jeff Griffin - mixing assistant
 Gene Grimaldi - mastering
 Rami Jaffee - optigan
 Tyson Kuteyi - engineer, scratching
 Oscar "DJ Grouch" Betancourt - scratching
 Oscar MacDonald - keyboards
 Mary Maurer - art direction, design
 Tristin Norwell - mixing engineer
 Ray Parker - conductor, string arrangements
 Dave Pensado - mixing
 Jason Ray - drums, toms
 Warren Riker - Mixing
 Eddy Schreyer - mastering
 Tom Szczesniak - conductor, string arrangements
 David E. Williams - keyboards
 Malik Worthy - bass

References

External links
Esthero's official website
Work Group
Sony Website
Still Breathing... Esthero's Breath From Another Turns Sweet Sixteen

1998 debut albums
Esthero albums
Work Records albums
Acid jazz albums
Chill-out music albums